Rui Ramos may refer to: 
 Rui Ramos (athlete) (born 1930), Portuguese athlete
 Rui Ramos (footballer) (born 1995), Portuguese footballer

See also 
 Ruy Ramos (born 1957), Brazilian-born Japanese footballer